George Wayne McCullough Jr. (born February 18, 1975) is a former American football defensive back who played five seasons in the National Football League (NFL) with the Tennessee Oilers/Titans and San Francisco 49ers. He was drafted by the Oilers in the fifth round of the 1997 NFL Draft. He played college football at Baylor University and attended Ball High School in Galveston, Texas. He was also a member of the Barcelona Dragons and Ottawa Renegades. McCullough played in Super Bowl XXXIV as a member of the Tennessee Titans.

References

External links
Just Sports Stats

Living people
1975 births
Players of American football from Texas
American football defensive backs
African-American players of American football
Baylor Bears football players
Tennessee Oilers players
Barcelona Dragons players
Tennessee Titans players
San Francisco 49ers players
Ottawa Renegades players
Sportspeople from Galveston, Texas
21st-century African-American sportspeople
20th-century African-American sportspeople